Kouibly (also spelled Kouibli) is a town in western Ivory Coast. It is a sub-prefecture of and the seat of Kouibly Department in Guémon Region, Montagnes District. Kouibly is also a commune.

In 2014, the population of the sub-prefecture of Kouibly was 43,392.

Villages
The seventeen villages of the sub-prefecture of Kouibly and their population in 2014 are:

Notes

Sub-prefectures of Guémon
Communes of Guémon